The Embassy of Canada to Hungary in Budapest is the diplomatic mission of Canada to Hungary. The embassy is also accredited to the countries of Slovenia and Bosnia and Herzegovina.

Overview 
The embassy provides consular services to Canadian citizens residing or travelling in Hungary, Slovenia, or Bosnia and Herzegovina, as well as international business development and general relations activities. These programs are delivered by a staff of four Canada-based diplomats and supported by about thirteen locally-engaged employees. Consular services are also provided to citizens of Australia through the Canada–Australia Consular Services Sharing Agreement.

On 24 October 2019, Caroline Charette was appointed as Canada's Ambassador to Hungary. She replaced Isabelle Poupart.

See also 
 Canada–Hungary relations

References

External links 
 Embassy of Canada to Hungary

Canada
Budapest
Canada–Hungary relations